Golnaka is a suburb of Hyderabad, India. The national highway, NH 202, passes through the suburb.

References 

Neighbourhoods in Hyderabad, India